Voinescu is a Romanian surname. Notable people with the surname include:

Alice Voinescu (1885–1961), Romanian writer
Eugeniu Voinescu (1842–1909), Romanian painter
Ion Voinescu (1929–2018), Romanian football player
Radu Voinescu (born 1958), Romanian poet and publicist
Sever Voinescu (born 1969), Romanian journalist, political analyst, diplomat and politician

See also 
 Voina (disambiguation)
 Voicu (surname)
 Voinea (surname)
 Voineasa (disambiguation)
 Voinești (disambiguation)

Romanian-language surnames